Byron Mann (born Byron Chan, 1967) is a Hong Kong-American actor of film and television. His best-known roles include Ryu in Street Fighter, Silver Lion in The Man with the Iron Fists, Wing Chau in The Big Short, Admiral Augusto Nguyen on The Expanse, Chang on Hell on Wheels, Yao Fei on Arrow, and Uncle Six in the Netflix series Wu Assassins.

Early life and education
Mann was born in Hong Kong to a Chinese American mother and a Chinese father. He was raised bilingual in English and Cantonese, and can also speak Mandarin and some Thai. Mann attended the Diocesan Boys' School, an all-boys secondary school in Hong Kong, where he was active in community theatre as both an actor and a writer. After graduating, Mann moved to California.

Mann received a degree in philosophy from UCLA in Los Angeles, California. After college, Byron attended USC Law School, but took a sabbatical after the first year. Back in Hong Kong, he received an acting role in the NBC TV movie Last Flight Out. He returned to Los Angeles, graduated from USC Law, passed the California bar, and pursued acting full-time. He also changed his last name from Chan to Mann.

Career
In 1994, Mann's acting career began. Mann starred in films such as Red Corner and The Corruptor, and in the television show Dark Angel, and has also co-starred in Catwoman and Invincible. He is best known as Ryu in Street Fighter (starring alongside Jean-Claude Van Damme and Raúl Juliá) and Koh in the manga-based movie Crying Freeman. In 2012, Mann starred alongside Russell Crowe and Lucy Liu in The Man with the Iron Fists, directed by RZA, and presented by Quentin Tarantino. In 2015, Mann appeared in The Big Short, a Paramount Pictures feature film directed by Adam McKay, alongside Brad Pitt, Christian Bale, Ryan Gosling and Steve Carell.  He also was a series regular on AMC's Hell on Wheels, playing the powerful railroad mercenary Chang. In 2018, Mann was a recurring character on Netflix's Altered Carbon.

In June 2018, it was announced that Mann was cast in the series regular role of Uncle Six on the Netflix series, Wu Assassins.

Personal life
Mann is interested in sports, especially tennis and golf. He was at one point a top-ranked tennis player, under 16 division, in Hong Kong. He is also a wushu practitioner, and has displayed his skills in a number of movies including Invincible and Street Fighter.

Mann is fluent in English, Cantonese, and Mandarin, and speaks some Thai after having learned it for his role in the 2013 film A Stranger in Paradise.

Awards and nominations
In 2016, Mann was nominated for the Golden Maple Award for Best Actor in a TV series broadcast in the U.S. for his role on Hell on Wheels.

Filmography

Film

Television

Video games

References

External links

 
 

Living people
American male film actors
American male television actors
Hong Kong emigrants to the United States
University of California, Los Angeles alumni
American wushu practitioners
USC Gould School of Law alumni
20th-century American male actors
21st-century American male actors
20th-century Hong Kong male actors
21st-century Hong Kong male actors
1967 births